Naticocha (possibly from Quechua ñat'i, nati sickness; bowels; the most hidden, qucha lake) is a  mountain in the Andes of Peru. It is located in the Pasco Region, Pasco Province, Huachón District, southwest of Yanacocha.

References

Mountains of Peru
Mountains of Pasco Region